XEAZ-AM is a radio station in Tijuana, Baja California, Mexico, broadcasting on 1270 AM. It is known as Radio Zeta 13.

History
XEAZ received its concession in 1948. The station was originally owned by Fernando Sánchez Mayans, related to the founding family of Cadena Baja California.

In 2008, Radiodifusoras Capital sold the station to Grupo Radiodigital Siglo XXI, which soon merged with Grupo Radio México.

In 2015, XEAZ and 24 other radio stations were folded into Grupo Radio Centro, a business owned by the same family as GRM. GRC leased and then sold the station to PSN in 2021.

References

Radio stations in Tijuana
Grupo Radio Centro